In mathematical combinatorics, the Transylvanian lottery is a lottery where three numbers between 1 and 14, inclusive, are picked by the player for any given ticket, and three numbers are chosen randomly. The player wins if two of their numbers, on a given ticket, are among the random ones. The problem of how many tickets the player must buy in order to be certain of winning can be solved by the use of the Fano plane.

The solution is to buy a total of 14 tickets, in two sets of seven. One set of seven is every line of a Fano plane with the numbers 1 to 7, the other with 8 to 14:

Because at least two of the winning numbers must be either high (8 to 14) or low (1 to 7), and every high and low pair is represented by exactly one ticket, at least two correct numbers are guaranteed to appear on one ticket with these 14 purchases.

21/26 of the time, the player will have only one ticket with only two numbers matched. If all three winning numbers are either high or low, the player would either have one ticket with all three numbers (1/26 chance of this occurring), or three different tickets that each matched two (4/26 chance).

See also
 Combinatorial design
 Lottery Wheeling

References

Combinatorics